Striostrea is a genus of bivalves belonging to the family Ostreidae.

The genus has almost cosmopolitan distribution.

Species:

Striostrea cahobasensis 
Striostrea denticulata 
Striostrea gigantissima 
Striostrea margaritacea  (synonym: Crassostrea margaritacea (Lamarck, 1819))
Striostrea paucichomata 
Striostrea prismatica

References

Ostreidae
Bivalve genera